The Water Polo Federation of Armenia, is the regulating body of water polo in Armenia, governed by the Armenian Olympic Committee. The Water Polo Federation of Armenia is a member of the European Swimming League and is affiliated with FINA. The headquarters of the federation is located in Yerevan.

History
The Federation was established in 1995 and the current president is Gagik Hovhannisyan. The Federation oversees the training of water polo specialists. Armenian water polo athletes participate in various European, international and Olympic level water polo competitions. The Federation cooperates with the USA Water Polo Federation, the Russian Water Polo Federation, and the Olympic Water Reserves Club.

See also
 Armenian Swimming Federation
 Sport in Armenia

References

External links 
 Water Polo Federation of Armenia official website
 Water Polo Federation of Armenia on Facebook

Sports governing bodies in Armenia
Sport in Armenia
Water polo
Armenia